Pygmaeorchis is a genus of flowering plants from the orchid family, Orchidaceae. It contains two known species, both endemic to Brazil:
Pygmaeorchis brasiliensis Brade - southeastern Brazil
Pygmaeorchis seidelii Toscano & Moutinho  - Minas Gerais

See also 
 List of Orchidaceae genera

References 

Laeliinae
Laeliinae genera
Endemic orchids of Brazil